was a female Japanese pop music duo consisting of Yukiko Iwai and Mamiko Takai, formed in 1985. In parallel to their membership in this duo, Iwai and Takai were at the same time members of Onyanko Club, a large pop group widely seen as a precursor to groups such as Morning Musume and AKB48. Onyanko Club sang back-up vocals on some of the songs released by Ushiroyubi Sasaregumi. They are most notable for singing several of the theme songs for the anime television series High School! Kimengumi. Throughout their short-lived career, the group released six singles, three albums, a promotion video, and two photo books (in addition to the Kimengumi soundtrack albums). The group disbanded after Takai's graduation from Onyanko Club on 5 April 1987.

History 
At first, this subgroup was called . They printed 30,000 record jackets for their debut song under this name, but the name was hastily changed to Ushiroyubi Sasaregumi due to a change of heart on the part of Kazuji Kasai, chief director of Yūyake Nyan Nyan, supervisor of Onyanko Club. According to Kasai, the reason Takai and Iwai were selected was because they resembled the heroines in the anime "High School Kimengumi". On the other hand, it is said that it was simply because they were going in the same direction to return home. They often took a cab home together after appearing on Yūyake Nyan Nyan.

The subgroup had a somewhat unusual appearance, due to the difference in height between Iwai and Takai. Takai was the taller one of the two, with a height of about 5' 2'' (about 157.5 cm), while Iwai barely reached 4' 11'' (about 150 cm),  so the height difference was remarkable. The contrast between Takai, who is reputed to be one of the most popular and beautiful girls in Onyanko Club, and Iwai, who is said to be a cute character like those in Anime, was also a topic of conversation. The debut song, released in October 1985, with the same title as the subgroup's name, was No. 5 on the Oricon chart. However, the five singles subsequently released all reached No. 1. They also released feature-length promotional video titled , filmed in Brazil.

In April 1987, Takai graduated from Onyanko Club, and Ushiroyubi Sasaregumi also disbanded. On this occasion, they both said that it was a very pleasant memory and that they loved this subgroup. On the other hand, It is said that Takai and Iwai did not get along well. Kasai claimed that although they had differences in orientation, they were not as incompatible as thought. however, Iwai herself subsequently admitted on a TV program that she and Takai did not get along well.

Discography

Singles
All singles were released as EP singles.
 / (5 October 1985, 7A0525, Canyon)
 / (21 January 1986, 7A0550, Canyon)
 / (2 May 1986, 7A0577, Canyon)
 / (27 August 1986, 7A0628, Canyon)
 / (23 November 1986, 7A0666, Canyon)
 / (21 February 1987, 7A0686, Canyon)

Sources:

Albums
(5 June 1986, C28A0495 (LP), 28P6545 (cassette), D32A0189 (CD), Canyon)
(15 December 1986, C28A0536 (LP), 28P6612 (cassette), D32A0248 (CD), Canyon)
(5 June 1986, C28A0555 (LP), ? (cassette), D32A0276 (CD), Canyon)

Sources:

Collection albums
(5 December 2001, Pony Canyon)
(19 May 2004, PCCA-02036 (CD + DVD of Magical Ushiroyubi Tour), Pony Canyon)

Sources:

Kimengumi albums
The High School! Kimengumi soundtrack albums were produced jointly for the anime with Onyanko Club, Musukko Club, and Ushirogami Hikaretai
(21 February 1986, C25G0411 (LP), Canyon)
(21 July 1986, D30G-0034 (CD), Canyon)
(21 October 1987, D32G0067 (CD), Pony Canyon)
(17 March 1999, PCCG-00489 (CD), Pony Canyon)

Videography

Further reading
 
 

Sources:

Voice acting
High School! Kimengumi (ep.63, as themselves)

References 

 
 
 

Musical groups established in 1985
Musical groups disestablished in 1987
Japanese pop music groups
Japanese girl groups
Japanese idol groups
1985 establishments in Japan
Onyanko Club
Musical groups from Tokyo